James Lockhart Autry (January 8, 1830 — December 31, 1862) was an American politician who served as the Speaker of the Mississippi House of Representatives between 1858 and 1859. Autry later served in the Confederate Army, where he was killed during the United States Civil War.

Early life
James Lockhart Autry was born on January 8, 1830, in Davidson County, Tennessee. Autry's father died at the Battle of the Alamo in 1836. Autry attended school in Holly Springs, Mississippi, with James Ronald Chalmers among his schoolmates.

Political career
Autry became a lawyer in 1852. Autry served in the Mississippi House of Representatives between 1854 and 1859. Between 1858 and 1859, Autry served as the Speaker of the Mississippi House of Representatives.

Military service and death
Autry joined the Confederate States Army and initially served in the Home Guards of Marshall County as a third lieutenant. Autry was promoted to a lieutenant colonel shortly after in the 9th Mississippi Regiment. Autry became a lieutenant colonel of the 27th Regiment of Mississippi Infantry in the spring of the 1862 in a reorganization. During the Battle of Stones River, also known as the Battle of Murfreesboro, on December 31, 1862, Autry was cheering his men forward, when he was struck in the head with a Minié ball. Autry died almost immediately. At the time of his death, Jefferson Davis had just signed a letter promoting Autry to general. The letter was on the way to Autry.

Personal life
Autry married Jeannie C. Valliant in 1858, and had a single child, James Lockhart Autry II, in 1859.

References

1830 births
1862 deaths
Members of the Mississippi House of Representatives
Speakers of the Mississippi House of Representatives
19th-century American politicians